Oscar Casares (December 8, 1977) is a Portuguese painter and a costume and fashion designer.

Education
He spent his childhood in the village of Santa Maria Távora. He began his academic career at Arcos de Valdevez. He graduated cum laude from the General Arts Course in Braga. He was taught and mentored by Maria de Lourdes Magalhães.

Career
He started his painting career in 1990. In 1993, he was invited to be the official portrait artist for the Belo-Belo Gallery. He was asked to paint the last official portrait of Pope John Paul II, and the portrait received high regard from the Pope in 2004. In 2008, he painted a portrait of Nicole Kidman.

Oscar's work is represented in more than three hundred private collections all over the world, Australia, Angola, Belgium, Brazil, Spain, USA, France, Portugal, United Kingdom, Switzerland and Vatican.

Selection of works
Eve, 1994
Self Portrait, 1995
As Facing Fear, 1996
The Viennese, 1997
The Sunset, 1997
The Kiss, 1998
The Coronation of Inês de Castro; 1999
Portrait of His Royal Highness Dona Isabel de Heredia, 2000
The Duchess of Bragança, 2001
Senhora da Oliveira, 2001
The Seven Gifts of the Holy Spirit, 2002
Pentecost, 2003
Last Official Portrait of John Paul II, 2004
Panel Salve Regina, 2005/2006
Senhora do Carmo Protecting the Carmelites, 2007/2008
Official Portrait of Nicole Kidman, 2008
Virtues of the Soul eclipsed by Diva Madonna, 2009
The Eucharist, 2009
Eternal Meditation, 2010
Santa Maria de Braga 2011
Our Lady with the Pomegranate Boy, 2012
Souplesse, 2013
Portrait of His Holiness Pope Francis, 2013/2014

Some exhibition work
1996: European traveling exhibition - Brussels, Belgium
1997: Exhibition at the Municipal Museum Gallery Vouzela Portugal
1998: "Travel on the human figure" - Monastery of St. Martin of Tibães - Braga, Portugal
1999: Nogueira da Silva Museum - Braga, Portugal
2000/2001: AYIC - New York, United States of America
2001: "In Memory of Women of the House of Braganza" - invited by the "European Heritage Days" - Palace of the Dukes of Braganza - Guimarães, Portugal
2001/2002: Church of Frei Aleixo - Évora, Portugal
2005/2006: Sameiro Sanctuary in Braga, Portugal
2007/2008: International Centre of the Order of Carmelites - Fatima, Portugal
2009: Oscar was invited to the Second International Contemporary Art Exhibition at the Museum of the Americas - Miami, United States of America
2009: Biennale of Florence, Italy
2010: The Association The Golden Triangle of Fine Arts, invited Oscar Casares to participate in the International Art Fair - Taza, Morocco
2010: That Gallery (Unwrap Your Mind Art Exhibition) - Hong Kong, China
2011: "The Story of the Nativity" - Monastery of St. Martin of Tibães - Braga, Portugal
2012/2013: Painting Exhibition and couture entitled "Hands Given Arts" - Pius XII Museum - Braga, Portugal

References

Living people
1977 births
20th-century Portuguese painters
20th-century male artists
21st-century Portuguese painters
21st-century male artists
Portuguese male painters